Janos is a municipality in the Mexican state of Chihuahua. It is located in the extreme northwest of Chihuahua, on the border with the state of Sonora and the U.S. states of Arizona & New Mexico. As of 2010, the municipality had a total population of 10,953.  The municipal seat is the town of Janos, Chihuahua, which shares its name with the municipality.

The El Berrendo/Antelope Wells border crossing is located in the municipality.

As of 2010, the town of Janos had a population of 2,738. Other than the town of Janos, the municipality had 315 localities, the largest of which (with 2010 populations in parentheses) was: Monte Verde (Altamira) (1,087), classified as rural.

The name "Janos" was given by the Janos people, the indigenous inhabitants of the area upon the arrival of the Spaniards.  The Janos were probably a sub-tribe or closely related to the Suma people.  Neither the Janos nor the Suma survived contact and are now extinct. Franciscan  missionaries originally built a mission in the location in 1640, under the name Soledad de Janos. The mission did not, however, survive a series of native revolts and was replaced on 16 October 1686 by a military presidio under Gen. Juan Fernández de la Fuente. The presidio retained control of the area until the municipality was established in 1820.

Towns and villages

The largest localities (cities, towns, and villages) are:

Other settlements:
El Berrendo (1)

Adjacent municipalities and counties

 Ascensión Municipality - east
 Nuevo Casas Grandes Municipality - southeast
 Casas Grandes Municipality - south
 Bacerac Municipality, Sonora - southwest
 Bavispe Municipality, Sonora - west
 Agua Prieta Municipality, Sonora - west
 Hidalgo County, New Mexico - north

Sister City
Janos Municipality has one sister city.:
 - Lordsburg, New Mexico, USA

Notes

References
Janos, Chihuahua (Enciclopedia de los Municipios de México)

Municipalities of Chihuahua (state)
States and territories established in 1820